David Yeshayahu Silberbusch (– ) was a Galician Hebrew and Yiddish writer and journalist.

Biography
David Yeshayahu Silberbusch was born in Zaleshtshik, Eastern Galicia, where he received a traditional Jewish education. He married the daughter of a wealthy Jewish landowner at the age of twenty, but became a widower within six months. he married a second time in Kolomaye, while living as a guest of his in-laws and studying Hebrew and German literature. He published his first work in Peretz Smolenskin's journal  in 1878.

Silberbusch later lived in Botoșani, Lemberg, and Vienna, settling in Palestine in 1934. He died there three years later.

References

1854 births
1936 deaths
Hebrew-language writers
Jews from Galicia (Eastern Europe)
People from Zalishchyky
Ukrainian emigrants to Mandatory Palestine
Yiddish-language journalists